Twenty Years of Dirt, subtitled The Best of the Nitty Gritty Dirt Band, is the second compilation album from the Nitty Gritty Dirt Band. It is a collection of hits from their career to that point. The album contained one new song, "Stand a Little Rain", which reached #5 on the Billboard Hot Country Singles & Tracks chart. The album reached 10 on the US Country charts and was certified platinum.

Track listing
"Intro/Mr. Bojangles" * (Jerry Jeff Walker) – 5:03from Uncle Charlie & His Dog Teddy 1970
"Ripplin' Waters" * (Jimmy Ibbotson) – 5:46 from Symphonion Dream 1975
"American Dream" ** (Rodney Crowell) – 3:48from An American Dream 1979
"Make A Little Magic" ** (Jeff Hanna, Richard Hathaway, Bob Carpenter) – 3:46from Make a Little Magic 1980
"Fire in the Sky" ** (Hanna, Carpenter) – 4:40from Jealousy 1981
"Dance Little Jean" *** (Jim Ibbotson) – 3:13from Let's Go 1983
"Long Hard Road (The Sharecropper's Dream) **** (Crowell) – 3:18from Plain Dirt Fashion 1984
"High Horse" **** (Ibbotson) – 3:13from Plain Dirt Fashion 1984
"Modern Day Romance" **** (Kix Brooks, Dan Tyler) – 3:30from Partners, Brothers and Friends 1985
"Partners, Brothers and Friends" **** (Ibbotson, Hanna) – 3:59from Partners, Brothers and Friends.. 1985
"Stand a Little Rain" **** (Don Schlitz, Donny Lowery) – 4:22 (Previously unreleased'')

Chart positions

Personnel
Bob Carpenter
Jimmie Fadden
Jeff Hanna
Jim Ibbotson
John McEuen

Production
Producer
 * William E. McEuen
 ** Jeff Hanna/Bob Edwards
 *** Norbert Putnam
 **** Marshall Morgan

Charts

Weekly charts

Year-end charts

References
All information from album liner notes unless otherwise noted.

Nitty Gritty Dirt Band albums
1986 compilation albums
albums produced by Norbert Putnam
Warner Records compilation albums